Jayuya is a town and municipality of Puerto Rico located in the mountainous center region of the island, north of Ponce; east of Utuado; and west of Ciales. Jayuya is spread over 10 barrios and Jayuya Pueblo (the downtown and administrative center of the city). It is the principal city of the Jayuya Micropolitan Statistical Area.

Named after the Taíno tribal leader, Hayuya, Jayuya is known for its skilled wood carvers. Among its monuments are the statue of Nemesio Canales and the bust of Hayuya, both by the Puerto Rican sculptor Tomás Batista.

History
The town of Jayuya was founded in 1911, but history traces non-indigenous settlers living in the region as far back as 1878. At that time, a small community was established there, separated from the larger cities of the coasts with little to no communication. Near the end of the 19th century, the town focused on the production of coffee, which greatly boosted the local economy.

In 1911, the town was officially declared a municipality with a population of more than 9,000.

In 1950, the town was the setting of the Jayuya uprising, in which Nationalists started a revolt against the Government of the United States led by Blanca Canales, a social worker, and her cousins, Elio and Doris Torresola. Canales led the group into the main town square and gave a speech, declaring Puerto Rico an independent republic. The police station was later attacked, telephone lines cut, and the post office burned to the ground. One police officer was killed and three others wounded in these attacks. The group held the town for three days, until it was bombed by U.S. planes supporting a ground attack by the Puerto Rico National Guard. Even though an extensive part of the town was destroyed, the news of the American bombing was not reported outside of Puerto Rico. Instead, it was reported by the American media stateside as an incident between Puerto Ricans.

When Hurricane Maria hit Puerto Rico in September 2017, the people of Jayuya had to resort to collecting spring water. Immediately following the hurricane, rescue and restoration efforts began by community members who gathered at the local high school. Most wooden structures were destroyed.

Geography
Jayuya is located in the center of the island of Puerto Rico, in a valley in the middle of the Cordillera Central. Due to this location, its terrain is mostly rough and steep.

The town's total area is estimated at 39.4 square miles (102.05 km2). Part of the Toro Negro State Forest is located within the municipality of Jayuya. Rivers like Río Naranjito and Río Yunes, as well as the Río Grande de Jayuya and its various affluents, flow through this municipality.

Barrios 

Like all municipalities of Puerto Rico, Jayuya is subdivided into barrios.

Coabey
Collores
Jauca
Jayuya Abajo
Jayuya barrio-pueblo
Mameyes Arriba
Pica
Río Grande
Saliente
Veguitas
Zamas

Sectors
Barrios (which are like minor civil divisions) and subbarrios, in turn, are further subdivided into smaller local populated place areas/units called sectores (sectors in English). The types of sectores may vary, from normally sector to urbanización to reparto to barriada to residencial, among others.

Special Communities

 (Special Communities of Puerto Rico) are marginalized communities whose citizens are experiencing a certain amount of social exclusion. A map shows these communities occur in nearly every municipality of the commonwealth.

Climate
As in most municipalities located in the mountain region, the climate is mostly cool with temperatures in the 80 to 70 °F (27 to 21 °C) range. However, they are known to go as low as 50 or 60 °F (10 or 16 °C) during some winters.

Demographics

Culture

Festivals and events
Jayuya celebrates its patron saint festival in September. The  is a religious and cultural celebration that generally features parades, games, artisans, amusement rides, regional food, and live entertainment.

Other festivals and events celebrated in Jayuya include:
 Three Kings Festival- January
 Jíbaro Tomato Festival- February
 National Indigenous Festival- November
 La Monserrate Marathon- September

Tourism
Due to its location, Jayuya is usually mentioned as the obligatory municipality to visit when visiting the center of the island of Puerto Rico. There are several landmarks for tourists to consider like the Nemesio Canales Museum at his historic home and El Cemí Museum, both located in the same area on a small valley to the west of the downtown district. Also, the Taíno tomb in the city's downtown has the remains of a Taíno Indian found in an excavation. Nearby, there's a monument to Chief Hayuya, cacique of the region.

In the outskirts of the city, tourists can visit the Cerro de Punta, highest peak in the island of Puerto Rico, as well as the other mountains mentioned (Tres Picachos, for example). The Toro Negro State Forest can also be reached through the city.Jayuya is home to the first aerostat in Puerto Rico and one of the world's largest. It is located in barrio Mameyes, at 3,200 feet above sea level. When the aerostat lifts, it reaches 3,500 feet where it has a panoramic view of 360 degrees.

Coffee production can be seen at Hacienda San Pedro located in Jayuya.

Economy

Agriculture
Jayuya's economy has always depended greatly on agriculture. Products like coffee, tomato, and other vegetables are produced and distributed in the region. Livestock is another part of the city's economy.

Industry
In the middle of the 20th century, several manufacturing industries established in Jayuya, aiming to revitalize the economy as well as provide work for the residents. Some of the companies currently in the city are Baxter Healthcare and Abbott Laboratories. A bridge used by these companies for the delivery of their materials to their plants was destroyed by Hurricane Maria. Work was set to begin on the bridge in 2019.

Government

Like all municipalities in Puerto Rico, Jayuya is administered by a mayor. The current mayor is Jorge González Otero, from the Popular Democratic Party (PPD). González was elected at the 1996 general election.

The city belongs to the Puerto Rico Senatorial district V, which is represented by two senators. In 2012, Ramón Ruiz and Martín Vargas Morales, from the Popular Democratic Party, were elected as district senators.

Transportation
There are 34 bridges in Jayuya.

Education
As all other municipalities in the island, Jayuya is part of the Puerto Rico Department of Education. It has several elementary schools distributed throughout the city's barrios. However, there's currently only one public high school, Josefina León Zayas High School, located in the city's downtown. The high school is LEED certified, for having a green-building design.

The Metropolitan University, a private institution, has a campus in the municipality's downtown area.

Former mayors
 1883 Julio Grau Battle – District Commissioner
 1911–16 Rosario Canales
 1916–20 Juan de Jesús López
 1920–24 Ramón B. Marrero
 1928 José Rivera Aponte (3 months)
 1928–36 Jesús Dávila Rodríguez
 1936–40 Vicente Santiago Reyes – Coalition Republican-Socialist
 1940–44 Juan Oliver Frau PPD
 1944 Mario Canales Torresola PPD (intern)
 1944–48 Manuel Diversé PPD
 1948–52 Ramón de Jesús Soto PPD
 1952–68 Adrián Torres Torres PPD
 1968–72 Rafael A. Ríos Delgado PNP
 1972–76 José D. "Lolo" Castro González PPD
 1976–84 Antonio Reyes Santiago PNP
 1984–92 Venancio A. Tejedor León PPD
 1992–96 José A. Rivera Rodríguez PNP
 1996 -Jorge L. González Otero(PPD)

Additional information
 July 11, 1883 – The first parish was established
 March 9, 1911 – Municipality was established
 Mayte Vega Torres – National Winner Walker, athlete

Symbols
The  has an official flag and coat of arms.

Flag
The flag is rectangular in shape and derives its symbolism from the coat of arms. It symbolizes the spirit of people proud of their Taíno heritage and their hospitality.

Coat of arms
Jayuya's coat of arms consists of a shield with a three tower crown above, which is standard for municipalities. Inside the shield, centered at the top, a crown representing Chief Hayuya's monarchy. In the center a green band with a white border representing the Tres Picachos (Three Peaks) mountains. The green color symbolizes the countryside and the town's matron, La Virgen de la Monserrate. At the bottom of the shield, is a petroglyph known as the Taíno Sun found in Jayuya.

Gallery

See also

List of Puerto Ricans
History of Puerto Rico
Did you know-Puerto Rico?

References

Further reading 
 
 Historia, imagen, y sentir de un pueblo: Jayuya – Aura Pierluissi de Rodríguez
 En busca de mis ángeles – Iris de Jesus
 Worker in the Cane – Sidney Mintz
 Tiempos revueltos – Vionette G. Negretti

External links 
 Puerto Rico Government Directory – Jayuya
 Images of Jayuya on the Arts & Culture project website by Google

 
Municipalities of Puerto Rico
Populated places established in 1878